Marianne Koch (born 19 August 1931) is a German actress of the 1950s and 1960s, best known for her appearances in Spaghetti Westerns and adventure films of the 1960s. She later worked as a television host and as a physician.

Career 
Between 1950 and 1971, Koch appeared in more than 65 films. She had numerous leading roles in the German cinema of the 1950s and 1960s. In the 1954 American thriller Night People, she appeared in a supporting role alongside Gregory Peck. Koch also had major roles in the Hollywood films Four Girls in Town and Interlude, both released in 1957. She remains perhaps best known internationally for Sergio Leone's 1964 production A Fistful of Dollars, which showcased her with Clint Eastwood as a civilian tormented by ruthless local gangsters, torn between her husband and child and the villains.

In Germany, she was probably best known for her many years of participation as one of the regular panelists in the highly popular TV game show Was bin ich?, the German adaption of the American TV show What's My Line?, which ran from the 1950s until 1988 and achieved ratings of up to 75% at its peak.

In 1971, she resumed the medical studies she had broken off in the early 1950s to become an actress. In 1974, she earned her degree and practiced medicine until 1997 as a specialist for internal medicine in Munich. Also in 1974, she was one of the initial hosts of Germany's pioneering talk show 3 nach 9 (Three After Nine), for which she was awarded the Grimme-Preis, one of the most prestigious awards of the German television industry. She also hosted other television shows, and in 2014, still had a medical advice program on radio.

Personal life 
Koch is the daughter of Marie Aumüller and Rudolf Schindler.

In 1953, Koch married the physician Gerhard Freund (1922–2008), with whom she has two sons. The marriage ended in 1973 after Freund began an affair with Miss World 1956, Petra Schürmann, whom he later wed. Koch later began a relationship with the writer Peter Hamm, which lasted from the mid-1970s until his death in 2019.

Films 

 The Man Who Wanted to Live Twice (1950) – Katja Hesse
  (1951) – Reporterin
 Dr. Holl (1951) – Anna
 Geheimnis einer Ehe (1951) – Musi Camphausen
 My Friend the Thief (1951) – Resl
 The Chaste Libertine (1952) – Gerty Seibold
 Dark Clouds Over the Dachstein (1953) – Christl, die junge Magd
 Scandal at the Girls' School (1953) – Marina von Leithen
 The Monastery's Hunter (1953) – Gittli
 The Poacher (1953) – Ursula
 Love and Trumpets (1954) – Bettina von Brixen
 Night People (1954) – Kathy Gerhardt
 Hubertus Castle (1954) – Geislein
  (1954) – Rosl
 Ludwig II (1955) – Prinzessin Sophie
 Des Teufels General (1955) – Dorothea 'Diddo' Geiss
The Blacksmith of St. Bartholomae (1955) – Marianne
 The Royal Waltz (1955) – Therese
 As Long as You Live (1955) – Teresa
  (1955) – Christiane Neubert
 The Marriage of Doctor Danwitz (1956) – Edith Danwitz – Mannequin
 If We All Were Angels (1956) – Elisabeth Kempenich
 Four Girls in Town (1957) – Ina Schiller 
 Salzburg Stories (1957) – Konstanze
 Der Stern von Afrika (1957) – Brigitte
 Vater sein dagegen sehr (1957) – Margot Ventura geb. Sonnemann
 Interlude (1957) – Reni Fischer 
 The Fox of Paris (1957) – Yvonne
 The Italians They Are Crazy (1958) – Cristina
  (1958) – Mingo Fabian
  (1958) – Dr. Petra Jensen
  (1959) – Carola Hauff
 The Woman by the Dark Window (1960) – Luise Konradin
  (1960) – Minna von Barnhelm
  (1960) – Hilde von Hessenlohe
 Spotlight on a Murderer (1961) – Edwige
 Blind Justice (1961) – Ingrid Hansen
 Napoleon II, the Eagle (1961) – Kaiserin Marie Louise
 Die Fledermaus (1962) – Rosalinde
 The Hot Port of Hong Kong (1962) – Joan Kent
  (1962) – Jeannine Messmer
 The Devil's Agent (1962) – Nora Gulden
  (1963, TV miniseries) – Helen Baker
 The Black Panther of Ratana (1963) – Dr. Marina Keller
 Death Drums Along the River (1963) – Dr. Inge Jung
 The Last Ride to Santa Cruz (1964) – Elizabeth Kelly
 The Monster of London City (1964) – Ann Morlay
 A Fistful of Dollars (1964) – Marisol
 Frozen Alive (1964) – Dr. Helen Wieland
 Trunk to Cairo (1965) – Helga Schlieben
 Coast of Skeletons (1965) – Helga
 The Hell of Manitoba (1965) – Jade Grande
 Jessy Does Not Forgive... He Kills! (1965) – Anna-Lisa
 Sandy the Seal (1965) – Karen Van Heerden (released in 1969)
  (1966) – Bea Bordet
 Clint the Stranger (1967) – Julie Harrison
  (1967, TV miniseries) – Mary Hotkins
 The Unnaturals (1969) – Mrs. Vivian Taylor
  (1970–1971, TV series, 13 episodes) – Renate Albrecht
 Reserl am Hofe (1984) – Narrator

References

External links and sources 

 
 
 
 Photos of the shooting of the film 'Solange du lebst'

1931 births
20th-century German actresses
20th-century German physicians
20th-century women physicians
Actresses from Munich
German film actresses
German television actresses
German women physicians
Living people
Physicians from Munich
Radio Bremen people
Spaghetti Western actresses
Western (genre) film actresses